Pride is an English surname. Notable people with this name include:
Alfred M. Pride (1897–1988), United States Navy admiral and pioneer naval aviator
Anne Pride (1942–1990), National Organization for Women activist
Charley Pride (1934–2020), American country music singer
Curtis Pride (born 1968), American baseball player
Dickie Pride (1941–1969), British rock and roll singer
Dicky Pride (born 1969), American professional golfer
Felicia Pride (born 1979), American entrepreneur
John Pride (c. 1737–1794), American politician from Virginia
Lou Pride (1944–2012), American blues and soul singer and songwriter
Lynn Pride (born 1978), American professional basketball
Mack Pride (1932–2018), American baseball player
Maria Pride (born 1970), Welsh television actress
Mary Pride (born 1955), American author and magazine producer
Michaele Pride-Wells (born 1956), American architect and educator
Mike Pride (musician), American musician
Mike Pride (writer), American writer
Nick Pride, British musician
Thomas Pride (died 1658), Parliamentarian general of the English Civil War
Thomas Pride (cricketer) (1864–1919), English cricketer
Thomas Pride (VC) (1835–1893), English soldier
Troy Pride (born 1998), American football player
Wayne Pride, Australian country music and memory lane musician

Fictional characters
 Dwayne Cassius Pride, the main character in the American TV series NCIS: New Orleans

See also
Pryde

English-language surnames